Lilies is a play written by Quebec playwright Michel Marc Bouchard, which premiered in 1987.

The play concerns the confession of an aging prisoner to a bishop. Through the confession, and the staged scenes acted out by the male prisoners in the prison chapel, we learn that the bishop and the prisoner were part of a gay love triangle, and that the bishop was responsible for the death of a young man many years ago. The play's English translation by Linda Gaboriau was published in 1991, and was made into a film called Lilies, which was directed by John Greyson.

Lilies was published in 1990 by Playwrights Canada Press.

The play was adapted as an opera, with music by Kevin March and a libretto by Bouchard, which premiered at Pacific Opera Victoria in 2017.

References

External links
Les Feluettes (Canadian Theatre Encyclopedia)

Canadian LGBT-related plays
1987 plays
Quebec plays
Plays set in Quebec
French-language plays
Dora Mavor Moore Award-winning plays
Canadian plays adapted into films
Plays adapted into operas